The Teller Mission Orphanage was a historic orphanage and mission house located at Corner of Post Officer Road and Tuksuk Street in Brevig Mission, Alaska. This small community was established in 1891 as a station for the importation of reindeer from Siberia to supplement the diet of the local Alaska Native population. The reindeer station was taken over in 1900 by the Norwegian Evangelical Lutheran church, which also undertook to operate a school and orphanage at the site. The -story wood-frame building was built in 1917, replacing the original orphanage built in 1907 by Rev. Toleef Larson Brevig, for whom the community is named. At the time of its listing on the National Register of Historic Places in 2001, it had been standing vacant for about 20 years. The building is no longer standing as of September 2015.

See also
National Register of Historic Places listings in Nome Census Area, Alaska

Notes

References

Properties of religious function on the National Register of Historic Places in Alaska
Buildings and structures completed in 1917
Buildings and structures in Nome Census Area, Alaska
Residential buildings on the National Register of Historic Places in Alaska
Buildings and structures on the National Register of Historic Places in Nome Census Area, Alaska